Zino was a Greek social networking website. In 2009, it was ranked one of the top Greek social destinations.

History
Zino started as a continuation of a news-focused Greek network, chit-chat.gr, which was established in 2005, and eventually replaced it. Three codenames were publicly announced for the launched versions, Reloaded, the first version announced, Phoenix, the version that established it as a social network in Greece, and lastly Revolution, the current version.

Features

User profiles
Each user has a user profile in the form of http://username.zino.gr/, where username is a chosen nickname by the user. The user profile lists several user details, among others their gender, age, and other personal information. It also exhibits several user-generated sections of content such as recent journals, polls, answers, photos, and the user's music preferences.

Photo albums
The users are given the opportunity to upload photos of themselves or other pictures they have taken to their user profile. These pictures are separated into albums, which the user can specify. Zino claims about 140,000 photos.

Friends
Like in most social networks, users can add people as their friends. Their friends are listed on their user profile accordingly.

Journals
Each user has a personal collection of articles that they can publish under the user profile. This collection is called "journals", and is publicly available for anyone to read.

Questions and answers
Each user is asked several personal questions while using the web application, allowing him to provide an answer or skip the question. These answers are then publicly available on the user's profile for other users to see, a feature that allows the owner to reveal numerous details about themselves.

Polls
Users are provided with the ability to raise a question on their user profile, which other users can then answer. This feature is available through polls, for which the user must specify a question and the possible answers. Commentary is furthermore available on poll pages after their creation.

Criticism

Greeklish
Zino has no regulations over the use of Greeklish. This has yielded to the extensive use of Greeklish, making it hard to read for people not familiar with the language. This policy of the website has been heavily criticized. Various campaigns have sprung to support or defend the usage of Greeklish with the website over time.

Data retention
Another controversy of the website was the inability to delete user accounts, but this feature was later added  after the users' request. The inability to remove comments after they have been posted, a feature also long requested by users, still remains a controversy.

References

External links
Zino, official website

Greek social networking websites
Internet properties established in 2007
2007 establishments in Greece